The year 1996 was the 25th year after the independence of Bangladesh. It was also the first year of the first term of the Government of Sheikh Hasina.

Incumbents

 President: Abdur Rahman Biswas (until 9 October), Shahabuddin Ahmed (starting 9 October)
 Prime Minister:
 until 30 March: Khaleda Zia
 30 March – 23 June: Muhammad Habibur Rahman
 starting 23 June: Sheikh Hasina
 Chief Justice: A.T.M Afzal

Demography

Climate

Economy

Note: For the year 1996 average official exchange rate for BDT was 41.79 per US$.

Events
 9 January - At least 16 people were killed and more than 100 injured in the head-on collision of two trains near Chandpur.
 15 February - The Sixth National Parliamentary Elections 1996 was held in Bangladesh on 15 February 1996. They were boycotted by most opposition parties, and saw voter turnout drop to just 21%. The result was a victory for the Bangladesh Nationalist Party (BNP), which won 300 of the 300 elected seats.
 22 March – Inauguration of the Liberation War Museum in Dhaka.
 25 March – Following escalating political turmoil, the sitting Parliament enacted the thirteenth constitutional amendment to allow a neutral caretaker government to assume power and conduct new parliamentary elections. On 30 March the President appointed former Chief Justice Muhammad Habibur Rahman as Chief Advisor (a position equivalent to prime minister) in the interim government. A new election was scheduled for 12 June 1996.
 14 May – Over 400 are killed as a tornado strikes northern Bangladesh.
 19 May – Failed attempt of coup d'état by Lt. Gen. Abu Saleh Mohammad Nasim, Bir Bikram.
 12 June – The Seventh National Parliamentary Elections 1996 were held in Bangladesh on 12 June 1996. The result was a victory for the Bangladesh Awami League, which won 146 of the 300 seats, beginning Sheikh Hasina's first-term as Prime Minister. Voter turnout was 75.6%, the highest to date. This election was the second to be held in 1996, following controversial elections held in February a few months earlier.
 5 November – Starting with a base of 350 points, the share price index of the Dhaka Stock Exchange rose as high as 3,648.75 points. The following day it started falling and it came down to 462 points in May 1999. The crash left millions of investors penniless.
 12 December – A 30-year treaty on sharing of the Ganges water was signed between India and Bangladesh.

Awards and Recognitions

Independence Day Award

Ekushey Padak
 Hasnat Abdul Hye (literature)
 Rahat Khan (literature)
 A K M Firoz Alam (music)
 Muhammad Abdul Hye (education)
 Sirajul Islam Chowdhury (education)
 Mohammad Kamruzzaman (journalism)
 Mohammad Shahjahan (education)

Sports
 Olympics:
 Bangladesh sent a delegation to compete in the 1996 Summer Olympics in Atlanta, United States. Bangladesh did not win any medals in the competition.
 Domestic football:
 Mohammedan SC won Dhaka League title while Abahani KC came out runner-up.

Births
 15 April – Faraaz Ayaaz Hossain, martyr (d. 2016)

Deaths

 10 January – Alamgir M. A. Kabir, social activist (b. 1911)
 20 February – Kazi Abul Monsur, physician and microbiologist (b. 1918)
 5 March – Khondaker Mostaq Ahmad, President of Bangladesh (b. 1919)
 9 April – Fazlul Halim Chowdhury, academician (b. 1930)
 14 May – Abdul Ahad, music director (b. 1918)
 31 May – Syed Golam Kibria, journalist (b. 1933)
 6 September – Mohammad Noman, academician
 6 September – Salman Shah, movie and TV actor (b. 1971)

See also 
 1990s in Bangladesh
 List of Bangladeshi films of 1996
 Timeline of Bangladeshi history

References

 
Bangladesh
Bangladesh